Henry Hubert (born 1946) is a Canadian football player who played for the Edmonton Eskimos.

References

Living people
1946 births
Edmonton Elks players